The Federal Police (Bundespolizei or BPOL) is the national and principal federal law enforcement agency of the German Federal Government, being subordinate to the Federal Ministry of the Interior, Building and Community (Bundesministerium des Innern, für Bau und Heimat (BMI)). The Federal Police is primarily responsible for border protection and railroad and aviation/air security. In addition, the agency is responsible, among other tasks, for the protection of federal constitutional bodies. It provides the federal alert police and GSG 9 special police unit, which can also be used to support the federated states of Germany. Ordinary police forces, meanwhile, are under the administration of the individual German states (Bundesländer) and are known as the Landespolizei. In addition to the Federal Police, the Federal Criminal Police Office and the German Parliament Police exist as further police authorities at the federal  level.

The Bundespolizei was named Bundesgrenzschutz (BGS) ("Federal Border Guard") until 2005, which at its foundation in 1951 had a more restricted role. The then BGS incorporated the former West German Railway Police (Bahnpolizei) (in 1992), formerly an independent force, and the East German Transportpolizei (in 1990). Prior to 1994, BGS members also had military combatant status due to their historical foundation and border-guard role in West Germany. In July 2005 the law renaming the BGS as the BPOL was enacted.

Missions

The BPOL has the following missions:

 Border security (Grenzpolizei or Grepo), to include passport control (only at borders with non-EU member countries prior to September 2015) and the provision of coast guard services along Germany's  of coastline.
 Providing transportation security at international airports and on German railways.
 Providing air (or sky) marshals.
 Providing counter-terrorism forces (GSG 9).
 Providing the federal government's mobile response force for internal security events.
 Protection of federal buildings such as Schloß Bellevue, the residence of the German Bundespräsident; they also protect the two highest German courts, both in Karlsruhe:
 The Federal Constitutional Court (Bundesverfassungsgericht) and
 The Federal Court of Justice (Bundesgerichtshof)
 Supporting international police missions for the United Nations and EU in Kosovo, Sudan, Liberia, Afghanistan, Gaza Strip, Moldova and Georgia.
 Providing in-house security for some German embassies.
 Providing rescue helicopter service.

The Bundespolizei can also be used to reinforce state police if requested by a state (Land) government. The BPOL maintains these reserve forces to deal with major demonstrations, disturbances or emergencies, supplementing the capabilities of the State Operational Support Units.  Several highly trained detachments are available for crisis situations requiring armored cars, water cannon or other special equipment.

BPOL investigators conduct criminal investigations only within its jurisdiction; otherwise the cases are referred to the appropriate state police force or to the federal criminal investigative agency, the Federal Criminal Police (Bundeskriminalamt, BKA).

In addition, the Bundespolizei cooperates closely with German state executive authorities, such as prosecutor's offices (Staatsanwaltschaft) in pursuing criminal investigations.

Restoration of border control tasking on all borders (2015)

On the night of 13 September 2015 Germany unilaterally reintroduced border controls, under emergency provisions of the Schengen Agreement, due to the 2015 European migrant crisis overwhelming Germany's available resources, law enforcement and otherwise. The nominally temporary border controls were initially put in place just on the border with Austria, but by the following day (Monday 14 September 2015) they were being put in place at all borders with fellow EU members. The same day, Austria and other EU members who were part of the Schengen Area began to put in place their own border controls (again meant to be temporary) in response to Germany's actions.

The new German border controls are to be primarily enforced both by the various Landespolizei of those German states that adjoin external borders, and in particular by the Bundespolizei.

Organization

The BPOL national headquarters (BPOL-Präsidium) in Potsdam performs all central control functions. Eight regional headquarters (BPOL-Direktion) control the BPOL stations that conduct rail police and border protection missions. These areas of responsibility conform to the federal state boundaries which they did not do prior to 1 March 2008.

The regional headquarters are as follows:
 Bad Bramstedt covering Schleswig-Holstein and Mecklenburg-Vorpommern as well as the North Sea and Baltic Sea as part of the German Federal Coast Guard.
 Hanover covering Bremen, Hamburg and Lower Saxony.
 Sankt Augustin covering North Rhine-Westphalia.
 Koblenz covering Saarland, Rhineland-Palatinate and Hesse.
 Stuttgart covering Baden-Württemberg.
 Munich covering Bavaria.
 Pirna covering Saxony, Saxony-Anhalt and Thuringia.
 Berlin covering Berlin and Brandenburg.

These regional headquarters each have an investigation department and a mobile inspection and observation unit. Moreover, they control the 67 BPOL stations (BPOL-Inspektion) which in turn control the Bundespolizeireviere or precincts located in places that require a 24-hour presence by BPOL officers.

A special Direktion is responsible for Frankfurt International Airport.

The central school for advanced and vocational training is in Lübeck and controls the six basic training schools in Swisttal, Neustrelitz, Oerlenbach, Walsrode, Eschwege and Bamberg. It is also in charge of the Federal Police Sport School in Bad Endorf and a competitive sport project in Kienbaum near Berlin. The sport school specialises in winter sport events and has trained many of Germany's top skiers and skaters such as Claudia Pechstein.

The Zentrale Direktion Bundesbereitschaftspolizei controls the mobile support and rapid reaction battalions located in Bayreuth, Deggendorf, Blumberg (near Berlin), Hünfeld, Uelzen, Duderstadt, Sankt Augustin, Bad Bergzabern, Bad Düben and Ratzeburg. The number of Bereitschaftspolizei companies increased in March 2008 from 28 to 29 comprising approx. 25 percent of Germany's police support units.

BPOL Special Units
The following special units also exist:

 The BPOL Aviation Group is subordinate to the Bundespolizei Direktion 11 (BPOLD 11) in Berlin. It controls the five aviation squadrons around the country that operate the force's helicopters. These are located in Fuhlendorf (north, with satellite airfield in Gifhorn), Blumberg (east), Fuldatal (centre), Oberschleißheim (south) and Sankt Augustin (west). Its duties include; border surveillance, monitoring installations belonging to German Rail, helping in serious accidents and disasters in Germany and abroad, searching for missing persons, searching for criminals on the run, supporting the police forces of the federal states, providing transportation for persons whose security is endangered, providing transportation for guests of the Federal government, supporting federal and state authorities, and providing air search and rescue services in coordination with the 12 air rescue centers throughout Germany.
 The BFE+ units (abbreviated from Securing of Evidence and Arrest of Suspects) are a specialized division of regular BPOL arresting units. These units were organized after the 2015 Charlie Hebdo attacks in France with the aim of responding faster and with higher firepower to massive terrorist attacks. BFE+ units are decentralized and work as a first response force until the more specialized and centralized GSG9 arrive at the scene, and are equipped similarly to SEK units.
 The GSG 9 counter-terrorism group is directly subordinate to the BPOL HQ.
 The BPOL Information and Communications Center is now a department of the BPOL HQ in Potsdam.
 Most special units of the Federal Police are subordinate to the unified command of Federal Police Directorate 11.
 The water police stations with 16 patrol craft and helicopters are part of the German Federal Coast Guard and assigned to coastal BPOL stations. The watercraft include six offshore patrol vessels, e.g. those of the Bad Bramstedt class, and the large Potsdam class as well as a number of fast inshore vessels and one tugboat.

Strength
The Bundespolizei as at 1 September 2020 consists of 51,315 personnel:
34,670 are fully trained law enforcement officers
8,215 candidates
8,430 salaried civilian (unarmed) support personnel

History

In 1951 the West German government established a Federal Border Protection Force (Bundesgrenzschutz or BGS) composed of 10,000 men under the Federal Interior Ministry's jurisdiction.  The force replaced allied military organisations such as the U.S. Constabulary then patrolling West Germany's borders.  The BGS was described as a mobile, lightly armed police force for border and internal security despite fears that it would be the nucleus of a new German army.  When West Germany did establish an army, the Bundeswehr, BGS personnel were given the choice of staying in the BGS or joining the army. Most decided to join the army.

In 1953, the BGS took control of the German Passport Control Service. In 1972 the Compulsory Border Guard Service was enacted by the parliament, which – in theory – is still in force, but suspended, similar to the conscription for the Bundeswehr. In 1976, the state police grades replaced the military rank structure and BGS training was modified to closely match that of the state police forces (Landespolizei). The West German Railway Police (Bahnpolizei), formerly an independent force, and the East German Transportpolizei were restructured under the BGS in 1990.

In July 2005, the BGS was renamed the Bundespolizei or BPOL (Federal Police) to reflect its transition to a multi-faceted federal police agency.  The change also involved a shift to blue uniforms and livery for vehicles and helicopters. The German Interior Ministry reviewed the structure of the BPOL in 2007 and in March 2008 made the structure leaner to get more officers out of offices and onto patrol.

Vehicles

The Bundespolizei typically favour vehicles made by German manufacturers such as the BMW 5 Series sedans and station wagons, Volkswagen Passat, Volkswagen Golf, and Volkswagen Transporter vans. However, due to the European Union's rules on contract bidding they have less freedom to choose specific manufacturers. Today, German police forces generally lease patrol cars from a manufacturer, usually for a period of three years. Bundespolizei vehicles have number plates that are based on the BP XX-YYY system. BP stands for Bundespolizei. Older vehicles may still have the BGS "BG" plates.

XX is a number from 10 to 55 indicating the type of vehicle:

10 to 12: Motorcycle
15 to 19: Car
20 to 24: Four wheel drive car
25 to 29: Car
30 to 39: Medium four wheel drive vehicle
40 to 49: Trucks and buses
50 to 54: Armoured cars.
55: Trailers

YYY is a combination of up to three numbers.

Weaponry
This is some of the weaponry utilized by the Federal Police: 
 H&K G36
 H&K MP5
 H&K P30

Aircraft inventory
The Federal Police now has been reduced to three flight amenities pattern of 94 helicopters. This is the largest civilian helicopter fleet in Germany.

Former aircraft

K-9 support
Approximately 500 working dogs are used in the Federal Police at present. Most of the dogs are German shepherds. Other dog breeds are also used such as malinois, Dutch shepherd, German wirehaired pointer, giant schnauzer, and rottweiler. They accompany their handlers on daily missions in railway facilities, at airports, at the border or in physical security. Most working dogs live with the families of their handlers. Basic and advanced training is performed under the supervision of the Federal Police Academy at the Federal Police canine schools in Bleckede (Lower Saxony) and Neuendettelsau (Bavaria) where dogs and handlers go through patrol dog and explosive detection courses.

Ranks

Until 2003, the federal police units had rank insignia almost identical to those used by the Schutzpolizei in the Weimar Republic and Nazi Germany (the East German Volkspolizei had until 1990 similar rank insignia, only with a bit different number of stars for respective ranks). In 2003, the federal German police ranks and insignia were unified with those used by police units of federal lands.

Junior ranks (Mittlerer Dienst)

Senior ranks (Gehobener Dienst)

Command ranks (Höherer Dienst)

See also
Law enforcement in Germany
Bundeszollverwaltung – Federal Customs Services
Landespolizei – German state police
Volkspolizei – Former East German police

References

External links

Bundespolizei home page (in German)
Information brochure about the Bundespolizei (in German and English) last updated August 2005
(in German) - You can see the old Bundesgrenzschutz in historic pictures and films and you can listen songs of the Bundesgrenzschutz
Official Telegram Bot

Federal law enforcement agencies of Germany
Port law enforcement agencies